The 1988–89 NBA season was the Spurs' 13th season in the NBA and 22nd season as a franchise. The Spurs had the tenth pick in the 1988 NBA draft, and selected Willie Anderson from the University of Georgia. The team also acquired rookie guard Vernon Maxwell from the Denver Nuggets, and hired Larry Brown as their new head coach. The Spurs struggled all season long, posting an 8-game losing streak in December, a 7-game losing streak in January, holding a 13–33 record at the All-Star break, then posting a 13-game losing streak between February and March, and a 9-game losing streak to end their season, finishing fifth in the Midwest Division with an awful 21–61 record, missing the playoffs. 

Anderson averaged 18.6 points, 5.1 rebounds, 4.6 assists and 1.9 steals per game, was selected to the NBA All-Rookie First Team, and finished in second place in Rookie of the Year voting, while Alvin Robertson averaged 17.3 points, 5.9 rebounds, 6.0 assists and 3.0 steals per game, and was named to the NBA All-Defensive Second Team, and Johnny Dawkins contributed 14.2 points, 7.0 assists and 1.7 steals per game, but only played just 32 games due to a leg injury. In addition, second-year center Greg Anderson provided the team with 13.7 points, 8.2 rebounds and 1.3 blocks per game, while Frank Brickowski provided with 13.7 points, 6.3 rebounds and 1.6 steals per game, and Maxwell contributed 11.7 points and 3.8 assists per game. 

Following the season, Robertson and Anderson were both traded to the Milwaukee Bucks, and Dawkins was traded to the Philadelphia 76ers.

Draft picks

Roster

Regular season

Season standings

z - clinched division title
y - clinched division title
x - clinched playoff spot

Record vs. opponents

Game log

Regular season

|- align="center" bgcolor="#ccffcc"
| 1
| November 5, 1988
| L.A. Lakers
| W 122–107
|
|
|
| HemisFair Arena
| 1–0
|- align="center" bgcolor="#ffcccc"
| 2
| November 8, 1988
| @ Houston
| L 102–120
|
|
|
| The Summit
| 1–1
|- align="center" bgcolor="#ccffcc"
| 3
| November 9, 1988
| Miami
| W 117–93
|
|
|
| HemisFair Arena
| 2–1
|- align="center" bgcolor="#ffcccc"
| 4
| November 11, 1988
| @ Dallas
| L 102–115
|
|
|
| Reunion Arena
| 2–2
|- align="center" bgcolor="#ffcccc"
| 5
| November 12, 1988
| Utah
| L 96–105
|
|
|
| HemisFair Arena
| 2–3
|- align="center" bgcolor="#ffcccc"
| 6
| November 16, 1988
| Detroit
| L 88–94
|
|
|
| HemisFair Arena
| 2–4
|- align="center" bgcolor="#ffcccc"
| 7
| November 17, 1988
| @ Denver
| L 112–139
|
|
|
| McNichols Sports Arena
| 2–5
|- align="center" bgcolor="#ffcccc"
| 8
| November 19, 1988
| Charlotte
| L 105–107
|
|
|
| HemisFair Arena
| 2–6
|- align="center" bgcolor="#ccffcc"
| 9
| November 23, 1988
| Atlanta
| W 119–109
|
|
|
| HemisFair Arena
| 3–6
|- align="center" bgcolor="#ffcccc"
| 10
| November 25, 1988
| @ Utah
| L 95–115
|
|
|
| Salt Palace
| 3–7
|- align="center" bgcolor="#ccffcc"
| 11
| November 26, 1988
| Phoenix
| W 117–104
|
|
|
| HemisFair Arena
| 4–7
|- align="center" bgcolor="#ffcccc"
| 12
| November 29, 1988
| @ Atlanta
| L 104–120
|
|
|
| The Omni
| 4–8
|- align="center" bgcolor="#ccffcc"
| 13
| November 30, 1988
| @ Miami
| W 105–101
|
|
|
| Miami Arena
| 5–8

|- align="center" bgcolor="#ccffcc"
| 14
| December 3, 1988
| New York
| W 122–109
|
|
|
| HemisFair Arena
| 6–8
|- align="center" bgcolor="#ffcccc"
| 15
| December 6, 1988
| Seattle
| L 107–112
|
|
|
| HemisFair Arena
| 6–9
|- align="center" bgcolor="#ffcccc"
| 16
| December 8, 1988
| Cleveland
| L 95–104
|
|
|
| HemisFair Arena
| 6–10
|- align="center" bgcolor="#ffcccc"
| 17
| December 11, 1988
| @ Portland
| L 123–128 (OT)
|
|
|
| Memorial Coliseum
| 6–11
|- align="center" bgcolor="#ffcccc"
| 18
| December 13, 1988
| @ Sacramento
| L 89–108
|
|
|
| ARCO Arena
| 6–12
|- align="center" bgcolor="#ffcccc"
| 19
| December 15, 1988
| @ Seattle
| L 107–122
|
|
|
| Seattle Center Coliseum
| 6–13
|- align="center" bgcolor="#ffcccc"
| 20
| December 17, 1988
| Golden State
| L 113–123
|
|
|
| HemisFair Arena
| 6–14
|- align="center" bgcolor="#ffcccc"
| 21
| December 18, 1988
| @ Houston
| L 109–120
|
|
|
| The Summit
| 6–15
|- align="center" bgcolor="#ffcccc"
| 22
| December 20, 1988
| @ Phoenix
| L 110–128
|
|
|
| Arizona Veterans Memorial Coliseum
| 6–16
|- align="center" bgcolor="#ccffcc"
| 23
| December 21, 1988
| Sacramento
| W 125–107
|
|
|
| HemisFair Arena
| 7–16
|- align="center" bgcolor="#ffcccc"
| 24
| December 23, 1988
| L.A. Clippers
| L 108–114
|
|
|
| HemisFair Arena
| 7–17
|- align="center" bgcolor="#ffcccc"
| 25
| December 26, 1988
| @ Miami
| L 109–111
|
|
|
| Miami Arena
| 7–18
|- align="center" bgcolor="#ffcccc"
| 26
| December 27, 1988
| @ Dallas
| L 101–110
|
|
|
| Reunion Arena
| 7–19
|- align="center" bgcolor="#ffcccc"
| 27
| December 30, 1988
| Boston
| L 99–112
|
|
|
| HemisFair Arena
| 7–20

|- align="center" bgcolor="#ccffcc"
| 28
| January 3, 1989
| Denver
| W 129–105
|
|
|
| HemisFair Arena
| 8–20
|- align="center" bgcolor="#ccffcc"
| 29
| January 5, 1989
| Philadelphia
| W 119–104
|
|
|
| HemisFair Arena
| 9–20
|- align="center" bgcolor="#ccffcc"
| 30
| January 7, 1989
| @ Golden State
| W 104–102
|
|
|
| Oakland-Alameda County Coliseum Arena
| 10–20
|- align="center" bgcolor="#ffcccc"
| 31
| January 8, 1989
| @ L.A. Lakers
| L 96–126
|
|
|
| Great Western Forum
| 10–21
|- align="center" bgcolor="#ffcccc"
| 32
| January 11, 1989
| Houston
| L 117–122 (2OT)
|
|
|
| HemisFair Arena
| 10–22
|- align="center" bgcolor="#ffcccc"
| 33
| January 12, 1989
| @ Utah
| L 91–115
|
|
|
| Salt Palace
| 10–23
|- align="center" bgcolor="#ffcccc"
| 34
| January 14, 1989
| Portland
| L 99–103
|
|
|
| HemisFair Arena
| 10–24
|- align="center" bgcolor="#ffcccc"
| 35
| January 16, 1989
| @ New York
| L 106–116
|
|
|
| Madison Square Garden
| 10–25
|- align="center" bgcolor="#ffcccc"
| 36
| January 17, 1989
| @ New Jersey
| L 112–117
|
|
|
| Brendan Byrne Arena
| 10–26
|- align="center" bgcolor="#ffcccc"
| 37
| January 19, 1989
| @ Washington
| L 112–115
|
|
|
| Capital Centre
| 10–27
|- align="center" bgcolor="#ccffcc"
| 38
| January 23, 1989
| Miami
| W 119–101
|
|
|
| HemisFair Arena
| 11–27
|- align="center" bgcolor="#ffcccc"
| 39
| January 25, 1989
| Utah
| L 103–117
|
|
|
| HemisFair Arena
| 10–29
|- align="center" bgcolor="#ffcccc"
| 40
| January 27, 1989
| @ Dallas
| L 82–126
|
|
|
| Reunion Arena
| 10–30
|- align="center" bgcolor="#ffcccc"
| 41
| January 28, 1989
| Houston
| L 91–96
|
|
|
| HemisFair Arena
| 11–30
|- align="center" bgcolor="#ccffcc"
| 42
| January 31, 1989
| Denver
| W 117–111
|
|
|
| HemisFair Arena
| 12–30

|- align="center" bgcolor="#ccffcc"
| 43
| February 3, 1989
| @ L.A. Clippers
| W 106–101
|
|
|
| Los Angeles Memorial Sports Arena
| 13–30
|- align="center" bgcolor="#ffcccc"
| 44
| February 4, 1989
| @ Portland
| L 100–137
|
|
|
| Memorial Coliseum
| 13–31
|- align="center" bgcolor="#ffcccc"
| 45
| February 7, 1989
| @ Sacramento
| L 99–114
|
|
|
| ARCO Arena
| 13–32
|- align="center" bgcolor="#ffcccc"
| 46
| February 9, 1989
| Chicago
| L 103–108
|
|
|
| HemisFair Arena
| 13–33
|- align="center" bgcolor="#ffcccc"
| 47
| February 14, 1989
| @ Seattle
| L 113–129
|
|
|
| Seattle Center Coliseum
| 13–34
|- align="center" bgcolor="#ffcccc"
| 48
| February 15, 1989
| @ Golden State
| L 96–133
|
|
|
| Oakland-Alameda County Coliseum Arena
| 13–35
|- align="center" bgcolor="#ffcccc"
| 49
| February 18, 1989
| @ Utah
| L 93–107
|
|
|
| Salt Palace
| 13–38
|- align="center" bgcolor="#ffcccc"
| 50
| February 20, 1989
| Dallas
| L 93–105
|
|
|
| HemisFair Arena
| 13–37
|- align="center" bgcolor="#ffcccc"
| 51
| February 22, 1989
| Golden State
| L 107–118
|
|
|
| HemisFair Arena
| 13–38
|- align="center" bgcolor="#ffcccc"
| 52
| February 24, 1989
| @ Indiana
| L 93–112
|
|
|
| Market Square Arena
| 13–39
|- align="center" bgcolor="#ffcccc"
| 53
| February 25, 1989
| @ Charlotte
| L 113–124
|
|
|
| Charlotte Coliseum
| 13–40
|- align="center" bgcolor="#ffcccc"
| 54
| February 27, 1989
| @ Milwaukee
| L 96–105
|
|
|
| Bradley Center
| 13–41
|- align="center" bgcolor="#ffcccc"
| 55
| February 28, 1989
| @ Chicago
| L 102–121
|
|
|
| Chicago Stadium
| 13–42

|- align="center" bgcolor="#ffcccc"
| 56
| March 2, 1989
| @ Cleveland
| L 84–112
|
|
|
| Richfield Coliseum
| 13–43
|- align="center" bgcolor="#ccffcc"
| 57
| March 4, 1989
| Denver
| W 106–89
|
|
|
| HemisFair Arena
| 14–43
|- align="center" bgcolor="#ccffcc"
| 58
| March 7, 1989
| Portland
| L 103–116
|
|
|
| HemisFair Arena
| 14–44
|- align="center" bgcolor="#ccffcc"
| 59
| March 9, 1989
| New Jersey
| W 112–98
|
|
|
| HemisFair Arena
| 15–44
|- align="center" bgcolor="#ccffcc"
| 60
| March 11, 1989
| Dallas
| W 97–90
|
|
|
| HemisFair Arena
| 16–44
|- align="center" bgcolor="#ffcccc"
| 61
| March 13, 1989
| L.A. Clippers
| L 103–115
|
|
|
| HemisFair Arena
| 17–44
|- align="center" bgcolor="#ccffcc"
| 62
| March 15, 1989
| Milwaukee
| W 110–108
|
|
|
| HemisFair Arena
| 17–45
|- align="center" bgcolor="#ffcccc"
| 63
| March 16, 1989
| @ Denver
| L 102–119
|
|
|
| McNichols Sports Arena
| 17–46
|- align="center" bgcolor="#ccffcc"
| 64
| March 18, 1989
| Utah
| W 114–98
|
|
|
| HemisFair Arena
| 18–46
|- align="center" bgcolor="#ffcccc"
| 65
| March 20, 1989
| @ Boston
| L 108–119
|
|
|
| Boston Garden
| 18–47
|- align="center" bgcolor="#ffcccc"
| 66
| March 22, 1989
| @ Detroit
| L 94–115
|
|
|
| The Palace of Auburn Hills
| 18–48
|- align="center" bgcolor="#ffcccc"
| 67
| March 24, 1989
| @ Philadelphia
| L 122–135
|
|
|
| The Spectrum
| 18–49
|- align="center" bgcolor="#ffcccc"
| 68
| March 25, 1989
| @ Miami
| L 105–107
|
|
|
| Miami Arena
| 18–50
|- align="center" bgcolor="#ccffcc"
| 69
| March 28, 1989
| Washington
| W 130–114
|
|
|
| HemisFair Arena
| 19–50
|- align="center" bgcolor="#ffcccc"
| 70
| March 30, 1989
| @ L.A. Lakers
| L 98–138
|
|
|
| Great Western Forum
| 19–51
|- align="center" bgcolor="#ffcccc"
| 71
| March 31, 1989
| @ L.A. Clippers
| L 106–109
|
|
|
| Los Angeles Memorial Sports Arena
| 19–52

|- align="center" bgcolor="#ccffcc"
| 72
| April 4, 1989
| Miami
| W 109–87
|
|
|
| HemisFair Arena
| 20–52
|- align="center" bgcolor="#ccffcc"
| 73
| April 6, 1989
| Sacramento
| W 122–116
|
|
|
| HemisFair Arena
| 21–52
|- align="center" bgcolor="#ffcccc"
| 74
| April 8, 1989
| Indiana
| L 126–128 (OT)
|
|
|
| HemisFair Arena
| 21–53
|- align="center" bgcolor="#ffcccc"
| 75
| April 10, 1989
| Seattle
| L 89–102
|
|
|
| HemisFair Arena
| 21–54
|- align="center" bgcolor="#ffcccc"
| 76
| April 12, 1989
| L.A. Lakers
| L 100–107
|
|
|
| HemisFair Arena
| 21–55
|- align="center" bgcolor="#ffcccc"
| 77
| April 14, 1989
| Dallas
| L 110–118
|
|
|
| HemisFair Arena
| 21–56
|- align="center" bgcolor="#ffcccc"
| 78
| April 15, 1989
| @ Phoenix
| L 91–137
|
|
|
| Arizona Veterans Memorial Coliseum
| 21–57
|- align="center" bgcolor="#ffcccc"
| 79
| April 17, 1989
| @ Houston
| L 91–99
|
|
|
| The Summit
| 21–58
|- align="center" bgcolor="#ffcccc"
| 80
| April 19, 1989
| Houston
| L 84–99
|
|
|
| HemisFair Arena
| 21–59
|- align="center" bgcolor="#ffcccc"
| 81
| April 20, 1989
| @ Denver
| L 113–136
|
|
|
| McNichols Sports Arena
| 21–60
|- align="center" bgcolor="#ffcccc"
| 82
| April 22, 1989
| Phoenix
| L 111–121
|
|
|
| HemisFair Arena
| 21–61

Player statistics

Awards and records
Alvin Robertson, NBA All-Defensive Second Team
Willie Anderson, NBA All-Rookie Team 1st Team

Transactions

References

See also
1988-89 NBA season

San Antonio Spurs seasons
San Antonio
San Antonio
San Antonio